Robert Charles Francis may refer to:

 Robert Francis (actor) (1930–1955), American actor
 Bob Francis (referee) (born 1942), New Zealand politician and former rugby union referee

See also
 Charles Robert Francis